Mass in C major may refer to:

Mass in C major (Beethoven), by Ludwig Beethoven (1807)
Missa Cellensis in honorem Beatissimae Virginis Mariae, by Joseph Haydn (1766)
Missa in tempore belli, or Mass No. 10 in C major, by Joseph Haydn (1796)
Sparrow Mass, or Missa Brevis No. 10 in C major, by Wolfgang Amadeus Mozart (1775-76)
Coronation Mass (Mozart), or Mass No. 15 in C major, by Wolfgang Amadeus Mozart (1779)
Mass No. 4, by Franz Schubert (1828)

See also
List of masses by Joseph Haydn
List of masses by Wolfgang Amadeus Mozart
Mass in C minor (disambiguation)